That Burning Feeling is a Canadian romantic comedy-drama film, directed by Jason James and released in 2013. The film stars Paulo Costanzo as Adam Murphy, a womanizing hotshot real estate agent who is forced into a period of self-examination when he tests positive for gonorrhea and must track down his recent sexual partners to inform them; during the process, he also meets Liv (Ingrid Haas), a woman who may offer him the opportunity to start fresh in a serious long-term relationship.

The cast also includes Tyler Labine, John Cho, Rukiya Bernard, Jay Brazeau, Emily Hampshire, Julia Benson, Dalila Bela and Ona Grauer.

The film was co-winner with Jeff Barnaby's Rhymes for Young Ghouls of the award for Best Canadian Film at the 2013 Vancouver International Film Festival.

References

External links

2013 films
2013 romantic comedy films
Canadian romantic comedy-drama films
Films shot in Vancouver
Films set in Vancouver
English-language Canadian films
2010s English-language films
2010s Canadian films